The silver dik-dik (Madoqua piacentinii) is a small antelope found in low, dense thickets along the southeastern coast of Somalia and in Acacia-Commiphora bushland in the Shebelle Valley in southeastern Ethiopia. Its back and flanks are grizzled silvery, while the limbs, ears, and muzzle are ochraceus in colour. Little is known about its status, but numbers are believed to be decreasing.

Together with the closely related Salt's dik-dik, this species forms the subgenus Madoqua in the genus Madoqua (other dik-diks are also in the genus Madoqua, but the subgenus Rhynchotragus). The taxonomy of this subgenus is complex and a matter of dispute. Though most recent authorities treat the silver dik-dik as a monotypic species, the silver dik-dik has been suggested as a subspecies of Swayne's dik-dik (itself now usually treated as a subspecies of Salt's dik-dik'').

References 

silver dik-dik
Mammals of Ethiopia
Mammals of Somalia
Fauna of the Horn of Africa
silver dik-dik